Singhpuria Misl was founded by the Sikh warrior Nawab Kapur Singh, a Virk Jat  who was born  in 1697 and later became a prominent Khalsa leader. The misl took its original name from a village Faizullapur in Amritsar and then changed the name of the village to Singhpura, with the misl eventually following.

Following are its heads:
Nawab Kapur Singh 
Khushal Singh
Budh Singh

Events 
Nawab Kapur Singh fought many battles. The Battle of Sirhind (1764) was a turning point of Singhpuria Misl. After the fall of Sirhind a considerable portion of present-day Rupnagar District came under the Singhpuria Misl.

By 1769, the Singpuria Misl had the following territories in its possession:- Some parts of the districts of Jalandhar and Hoshiarpur in Doaba, Kharparkheri and Singhpura in Bari-Doab and Abhar, Adampur, Chhat, Banoor, Manauli Ghanauli, Bharatgarh, Kandhola, Chooni, Machhli Bhareli, Banga, Bela, Attal Garh and some other places in the province of Sirhind.

References

Jat princely states
Indian surnames
Social groups of Punjab, India
Misls
History of Sikhism
Sikh Empire
Princely states of India
Princely states of Punjab
Amritsar
History of Punjab
History of Punjab, India